Roche Abbey is a now-ruined abbey in the civil parish of Maltby, Rotherham, South Yorkshire, England. It is in the valley of Maltby Dyke, known locally as Maltby Beck, and is administered by English Heritage.  It is a scheduled monument and Grade II* listed in the National Register of Historic Parks and Gardens.

Early history

The abbey was founded in 1147 when the stone buildings were raised on the north side of the beck. The co-founders of Roche were Richard de Busli, likely the great-nephew of the first Roger de Busli, the Norman magnate builder of Tickhill Castle, and Richard FitzTurgis. When the monks first arrived in South Yorkshire from Newminster Abbey in Northumberland, they chose the most suitable side of the stream that runs through the valley to build their new Cistercian monastery.  Twenty-five years later, at the end of the century, the Norman Gothic great church, dedicated to the Virgin Mary, had been finished, as well as most of the other buildings.  The control of the abbey was vested in the de Vesci family, lords of Rotherham, who in turn subfeuded the land to Richard FitzTurgis, lord of Wickersley (and who took Wickersley as his surname).

From the start, the Abbey of Roche, built for the so-called White Monks, as the Cistercians were known, had an almost otherworldly air. It was, after all, built at the northern end of an area once covered by Sherwood Forest, and it was said that Robin Hood went to Mass here. (A diocesan pilgrimage is still made today on Trinity Sunday.) At its height it supported a community of around 175 men, of whom about 60 were choir monks, the remainder being lay brothers, a Cistercian innovation.

Eventually, on the death of co-founder FitzTurgis, control of the abbey passed to his son Roger, now 'de Wickersley', and then eventually to a granddaughter Constantia, who married William de Livet (Levett), a family of Norman origin who were lords of the nearby village of Hooton Levitt (or Levett). The abbey continued in the Levett family until 1377, when John Levett sold his rights in the abbey to the London merchant Richard Barry. By the time of the dissolution full control of Roche Abbey was held by Henry Clifford, 2nd Earl of Cumberland, who came in for numerous grants at the Dissolution as he was married to the niece of King Henry VIII.

Despoliation

The Roche Abbey records have been either lost or destroyed, so there are no accounts of the abbey's activities, other than that there were 14 monks and an unknown number of novices at the time of the dissolution by Henry VIII on 23 June 1538. It was this that lead to the abbey being reduced to ruins, although the surviving parts of the walls of the north and south transepts are still impressive. The local community at time of the dissolution decided they had first right of claim on Roche Abbey and its possessions.  A very detailed account exists citing the terrible destruction of the abbey and its valuable artefacts. Timber, lead and stone were also removed in vast quantities.

The chronicle of the despoliation was written by Michael Sherbrook, a priest and rector of nearby Wickersley who watched the pillaging. "For the church was the first thing that was spoiled; then the abbot's lodging, the dormitory and refectory, with the cloister and all the buildings around, within the abbey walls," wrote Sherbrook in his eyewitness account. "For nothing was spared except the ox-houses and swinecoates and other such houses or offices that stood outside the walls – these had greater favour shown to them than the church itself."

"This was done on the instruction of [Thomas] Cromwell, as Fox reports in his Book of Acts and Monuments", wrote Sherbrook in his remarkable account. "It would have pitied any heart to see the tearing up of the lead, the plucking up of boards and throwing down of the rafters. And when the lead was torn off and cast down into the church and the tombs in the church were all broken (for in most abbeys various noblemen and women were buried, and in some kings, but their tombs were no more regarded than those of lesser persons, for to what end should they stand when the church over them was not spared for their cause) and all things of value were spoiled, plucked away or utterly defaced, those who cast the lead into fodders plucked up all the seats in the choir where the monks sat when they said service."

"These seats were like the seats in minsters; they were burned and the lead melted, although there was plenty of wood nearby, for the abbey stood among the woods and the rocks of stone," continued Sherbrook. "Pewter vessels were stolen away and hidden in the rocks, and it seemed that every person was intent upon filching and spoiling what he could. Even those who had been content to permit the monks' worship and do great reverence at their matins, masses and services two days previously were no less happy to pilfer, which is strange, that they could one day think it to be the house of God and the next the house of the Devil – or else they would not have been so ready to have spoiled it."

Left in ruin, the land passed through many private hands until the 4th Earl of Scarbrough decided it needed revitalising to enhance his adjoining family seat at Sandbeck Park. Lord Scarborough enlisted the talents of Capability Brown. With an astonishing disregard for history, Brown demolished buildings, built large earth mounds and turfed the whole site. Until the end of the 19th century Roche Abbey remained buried beneath Brown's work and wooded parkland. But subsequent excavation in the 1920s returned Roche to its former splendour.

The abbey today

The site is now in the care of English Heritage. The cliff path walk provides access to a view across the abbey grounds where its layout can be appreciated. Many of the buildings are low-standing but the walls of the church still stand to full height and the gothic French idealism thrust into its design and architecture is visible.  Later additions to the buildings included a kitchen area and abbot's quarters, built on the other side of the beck and accessed by a bridge which still stands. The monks' latrines were over Maltby Beck so the running water took away the waste. The stream was dammed higher up to ensure fast-flowing water: quite a modern facility for the 13th century. There are several local legends concerning ghosts, tunnels to other buildings, and even a lost wishing well.

Burials at the abbey

The nave was the burial place for the lay brothers but others outside the immediate abbey community buried here include Peryn of Doncaster and his wife, Ysabel. There is also a tomb of the 14th-century Rilston family, presumably local worthies.

References

External links

 Images of Roche Abbey, RotherhamWeb, Rotherhamweb.co.uk
 Roche Abbey at English Heritage

Buildings and structures in the Metropolitan Borough of Rotherham
English Heritage sites in South Yorkshire
Cistercian monasteries in England
Monasteries in South Yorkshire
Ruins in South Yorkshire
1147 establishments in England
Religious organizations established in the 1140s
Churches in South Yorkshire
Archaeological sites in South Yorkshire
Christian monasteries established in the 12th century
Gardens by Capability Brown
Ruined abbeys and monasteries
Monasteries dissolved under the English Reformation
Grade II* listed parks and gardens in South Yorkshire
Maltby, South Yorkshire